The Monte Carlo Invitational was a senior (over 50s) men's professional golf tournament on the European Senior Tour. It was played from 1998 to 2002 at the Monte Carlo Golf Club, La Turbie, Alpes-Maritimes, France. The course is near Mont Agel, in France, as there are no golf courses in Monaco. The Monte Carlo Open was played at the same venue from 1984 to 1992.

The 2001 event, scheduled for 14–16 September, was cancelled because of the September 11 terrorist attacks.

Winners

References

Former European Senior Tour events
Defunct golf tournaments in France
Golf in Monaco
Recurring sporting events established in 1999
Recurring sporting events disestablished in 2002